John Pattinson Richardson (born 5 February 1949) was an English professional footballer who played as a defender in the Football League for Millwall, Brentford, Fulham and Aldershot.

Playing career

Millwall 
Richardson began his career in the youth system at Third Division club Millwall and made two appearances during the 1965–66 season.

Brentford 
Richardson moved to Fourth Division club Brentford in May 1966 and went into the youth and reserve teams. He made his senior debut at age 17 in a 3–1 defeat to Lincoln City on 7 September 1966. Richardson came to prominence amongst the Brentford supporters in a match versus Tranmere Rovers on 10 February 1967. An injury to Peter Gelson saw Richardson included in the starting lineup and his performance led to a write-up in the Middlesex Chronicle. Richardson finished the 1966–67 season with 24 appearances to his name and played in the victorious 1967 London Challenge Cup-winning team. He was a virtual ever-present during the 1967–68 season, making 45 appearances. Richardson made four appearances during the 1969–70 season before departing the club, having made 96 appearances for the Bees.

Fulham 
Richardson joined Brentford's West London rivals Fulham in August 1969 for a £12,500 fee. He made 71 appearances and scored six goals for the club in a four-year spell and helped the club to promotion to the Second Division in the 1970–71 season.

Dallas Tornado (loan) 
Richardson had a loan spell at North American Soccer League club Dallas Tornado during the 1972 season and he scored once in 9 appearances.

Aldershot 
Richardson dropped into the Third Division to sign for Aldershot in July 1973. He made 121 appearances and scored six goals for the club before departing in 1977.

Hillingdon Borough 
After departing Aldershot, Richardson dropped into non-League football and signed for Southern League Premier Division club Hillingdon Borough.

Personal life 
Richardson's uncle was Billy Gray, who managed Richardson at Millwall and Brentford.

Honours 
Brentford
 London Challenge Cup: 1966–67

Fulham

 Football League Third Division second-place promotion: 1970–71

Career statistics

References

1949 births
English footballers
Millwall F.C. players
Fulham F.C. players
Aldershot F.C. players
Brentford F.C. players
Association football defenders
Hillingdon Borough F.C. players
Southern Football League players
Dallas Tornado players
North American Soccer League (1968–1984) players
English expatriate footballers
English expatriate sportspeople in the United States
Living people
Footballers from Northumberland
Expatriate soccer players in the United States
People from Stannington, Northumberland